Stoyan Stavrev (born 7 December 1975) is a former Bulgarian football goalkeeper, and currently the goalkeeping coach at Cherno More Varna.

Career
Stavrev joined Litex Lovech in the summer of 1997. On 12 November 1997, he made his Litex debut in a 2–1 victory against Kremikovtsi in the Bulgarian Cup Second Round. Stavrev played 76 league matches in seven years for Litex's first team, as he was often the club's second-choice keeper behind Vitomir Vutov. In 2012, he became a goalkeeping coach at Cherno More, where he was also registered as an active player following an injury to Petar Denchev.

Career statistics

Honours

Club
Litex Lovech
 A Group (2): 1997–98, 1998–99
 Bulgarian Cup (2): 2001, 2004

References

External links
Player Profile at Lportala.net

1975 births
Living people
Bulgarian footballers
First Professional Football League (Bulgaria) players
Association football goalkeepers
FC Haskovo players
PFC Litex Lovech players
PFC Beroe Stara Zagora players
PFC Lokomotiv Plovdiv players
PFC Cherno More Varna players
People from Topolovgrad
Sportspeople from Haskovo Province